Churching may refer to:
 Churching of women is the ceremony wherein a purification and blessing is given to mothers after recovery from childbirth in both Eastern and Western Christian traditions
 The attendance of any church activity, including Sunday School, sacrament meetings, and weekday activities.

Christian terminology